Ulanhot, formerly known as Wangin Süm, alternatively Wang-un Süme, Ulaγanqota (Red City) in Classical Mongolian, is a county-level city and the administrative center of Hinggan League in the east of the Inner Mongolia autonomous region of China. Formerly known as Wangyehmiao or Wangyemiao, the city became the first capital of Inner Mongolia, the first autonomous region in China, on 1 May 1947, until the regional capital moved to Zhangjiakou in late December 1949; the regional capital moved again in June 1952 to Hohhot, which remains the capital to this day.

The city is connected to Baicheng, Jilin by the Baicheng–Arxan railway, which runs through the pass south of Ulanhot. China's National Highway 302 runs from Tumen, Jilin to Ulanhot. In the 7918 Network of Highways it will be on the route from Hunchun to Ulanhot . The city is also served by Ulanhot Yilelite Airport (ICAO code ZBUL, IATA code HLH). Routes flown by Air China and Hainan Airlines connect Ulanhot with Beijing Capital International Airport and Hohhot.

Just outside the city is a tomb from the Yuan dynasty and a temple dedicated to Genghis Khan. The temple was constructed in 1940. In the year 2002 it received funds for significant expansion.

Climate 
Ulan Hot has a monsoon-influenced humid continental climate (Köppen Dwa). Winters are long, cold and dry, while summers are very warm. Over two-thirds of the annual rainfall occurs from May to August.

References

County-level divisions of Inner Mongolia
Cities in Inner Mongolia